The Tower of San Niccolò, once part of a gate or porta in the former defensive walls of Florence, is now located, isolated in piazza Giuseppe Poggi, in the district of Oltrarno, Florence, region of Tuscany, Italy. The portal was first erected in 1324.

The tower and its gate were elaborated in the designs of Arnolfo di Cambio for circumferential walls around Florence. These walls were, in the main, destroyed in the 19th century as a project of urban renewal, Risanamento, in part led by Giuseppe Poggi. This tower was spared, in part because of its panoramic view of the city. There are 160 steps to the summit.

References

Towers in Florence
Gates of Florence
Buildings and structures completed in 1324
Oltrarno